Dream Street is a 1921 American silent romantic drama film directed by D. W. Griffith, and starring Carol Dempster, Charles Emmett Mack, and Ralph Graves in a story about a love triangle set in London, and based on two short stories by Thomas Burke, "Gina of Chinatown" and "Song of the Lamp". The cast also features Tyrone Power, Sr.

The film, released by United Artists, was poorly received in its day, and critics still consider it one of Griffith's worst films.

Plot
As described in a film magazine review, Gypsy Fair, a young dancer, is forced through circumstances to live in the London Limehouse district and associate with the other residents there. Through her courage and loyalty, she is forced into numerous hazardous situations from all of which she emerges unharmed. Finally, she marries the man she has reformed and finds true happiness with him.

Cast

Premiere
The original 1921 version of Dream Street is notable for a brief sequence when D. W. Griffith steps out in front of a curtain at the beginning of the movie, and talks to the audience about the film, using Photokinema, an early sound-on-disc process developed by Orlando Kellum. Some films made in the Photokinema process, including Griffith's Dream Street introduction at the beginning, are preserved at the UCLA Film and Television Archive.

The silent version premiered on April 12, 1921, at the Central Theatre in New York City. On April 27, Griffith and Ralph Graves recorded their respective sound segments at Orlando Kellum's Photokinema office at 203 West 40th Street.

The premiere engagement of the sound version of Dream Street took place on May 2, 1921, at Town Hall in New York City, with Griffith's introduction. The film reopened on May 15, now also with two other short sound sequences — Ralph Graves singing a love song, and background noise in a scene showing a craps game. No other theaters could show the sound version of the film, for no other theaters had the Photokinema sound system installed.

On Sunday, May 29, Dream Street opened at the Shubert Crescent Theater in Brooklyn with a program of short films made in Phonokinema. However, business was poor, and the program soon closed.

Reception
Leonard Maltin's Movie Guide describes the film as "disappointing", owing to Dempster and her performance.

References

External links

Progressive Silent Film List: Dream Street at silentera.com
Still, poster, lantern slide at silenthollywood.com

1921 films
1921 romantic drama films
American black-and-white films
American romantic drama films
American silent feature films
Articles containing video clips
Films based on multiple works
Films based on short fiction
Films based on works by Thomas Burke
Films directed by D. W. Griffith
Films set in London
Transitional sound films
United Artists films
Films scored by Louis Silvers
Early sound films
1920s American films
Silent romantic drama films
Silent American drama films